"Goodnight Mr. Bean" is the thirteenth episode of the British television series Mr. Bean, produced by Tiger Aspect Productions and Thames Television for Central Independent Television. It was first broadcast on ITV on Tuesday, 31 October 1995.

Plot

Act 1: The Hospital 
As his left hand got stuck in a teapot, Mr. Bean drives to the hospital and parks his car right behind an ambulance, obstructing the rear doors in the process. Inside, Bean grows impatient while waiting in the queue and cheats his way to the front by tossing a girl's doll aside and then starting a brawl between two men. After Bean pulls his numbered ticket from the dispenser, he sits next to a female patient in a body cast  and taunts her by stretching his body. Bean sees his ticket numbered 76 as the digital counter shows 23. Just as Bean checks the time on his watch, he inadvertently reveals his hand stuck in his teapot, prompting the woman at the reception desk and the patient sitting next to him to laugh at him.

Bean becomes annoyed with how long he is forced to wait, and then swaps his ticket for a lower-numbered ticket, showing 52, from the severely-injured patient, and sneakily turns the digital counter upside down so that 25 will look like 52. However, the patient thwarts Bean by grabbing on the handle of the teapot on his hand, and the digital counter is turned around back to its normal position after patients complain of their tickets being ignored and skipped. Some time later, Bean falls asleep in waiting and, as the digital counter reaches the real 52, wakes up and loses his ticket (back to the patient who originally had it). As a result, Bean has to get another ticket and he, once again, starts a fight between the same two men from earlier to get immediately to the reception desk. Bean gets angry and frustrated when he takes a higher number ticket and he throws it in the bin, but his other hand becomes stuck as he tries to push down the ticket into the bin to show his frustration. Now with two hands stuck, Bean uses his mouth to take out another ticket from the dispenser and walks back to his seat (while behind him, the two men continue brawling with each other).

Act 2: The Queen's Guard 
Bean visits Windsor Castle where he takes a few photographs, including one of the inside of a dustbin and another of a nude statue after covering the private part with a plastic wrapper from the bin. He then pries the gnomon off a sundial to place his Polaroid camera on the stand, in order to get a photo of himself with a Queen's Guard (Rupert Vansittart). He dresses the guard up with flowers and other things, trims his moustache (into a toothbrush style, similar to that of Adolf Hitler and Charlie Chaplin) and hangs Teddy off his bayonet. While Bean is doing this, the guard attempts to remain motionless (which proves difficult as especially when Bean starts to dangerously clean the trigger of his rifle). Just as Bean has wound the self timer on his camera, the charge is called and the guard marches away along with Teddy just before the camera snaps the photo. Off-screen, Bean groans in anger and frustration from this.

Act 3: Sleeping Trouble 
That night, Bean gets ready for bed, using an electric toothbrush to clean his teeth and ears, reading an Asterix comic to Teddy and finally shooting out a Mazda incandescent light bulb with a handgun. In order to get to sleep, he scares away some cats outside his window by disguising himself as a dog and barking, tries lying in different positions, then watches a chess game on TV, he becomes startled when the television channel cuts to a Bodyform advertisement with loud rock music. Finally, he takes out a picture of a flock of sheep and begins counting them, first with his finger and then, after losing count a few times, with the assistance of a calculator. When he sees the number of sheep on the calculator display, he instantly falls asleep. As the closing credits roll, he falls onto the floor.

Cast
 Rowan Atkinson as Mr. Bean
 Elizabeth Bennett as Hospital Receptionist
 Suzy Aitchison as Hospital Nurse
 Rupert Vansittart as Queen's Guard

Production 
The opening and closing titles featured a new recording of the choral theme, performed by the Choir of Christ Church Cathedral, Oxford, which debuted in Tee Off, Mr. Bean. The first act was filmed at the permanently closed National Temperance Hospital in London. Studio sequences were recorded before a live audience at Teddington Studios.

References

External links 
 

Mr. Bean episodes
1995 British television episodes
Television shows written by Rowan Atkinson
Television shows written by Robin Driscoll